Ananta Narcina Naik was a politician from Goa. Popularly known as Babu Naik, he was a member of Goa Legislative Assembly  from Margao. He was businessman turned politician. He had established PANNaik Group in 1985.

References

Members of the Goa Legislative Assembly
People from South Goa district
People from Margao
20th-century Indian politicians
Indian National Congress politicians from Goa
Independent politicians in India
Indian National Congress (U) politicians
Year of birth missing
Year of death missing